In terms of fiction, a quibble is a plot device, used to fulfill the exact verbal conditions of an agreement in order to avoid the intended meaning. Typically quibbles are used in legal bargains and, in fantasy, magically enforced ones.

Examples 

William Shakespeare used a quibble in The Merchant of Venice.  Portia saves Antonio in a court of law by pointing out that the agreement called for a pound of flesh, but no blood, and therefore Shylock can collect only if he sheds no blood, which is not physically possible. He also uses one in Macbeth where Macbeth is killed by Macduff, despite it being prophesied by the Three Witches that "none of woman born" shall vanquish him, as the latter character was born by Caesarean section. In a second prophecy, Macbeth is told that he has nothing to fear until Great Birnam Wood comes to Dunsinane Hill. He feels safe since he knows that forests cannot move, but is overcome when the English army, shielded with boughs cut from Birnam Wood, advances on his stronghold at Dunsinane.

The old testament likewise contains examples of legalistic quibbles.  In Genesis 18, Abraham gets God to acknowledge that killing many righteous people alongside the sinners in Sodom would be wrong, and then works his way down to sparing the city for the sake of a single righteous one.

A pact with the Devil commonly contains clauses that allow the devil to quibble over what he grants, and equally commonly, the maker of the pact finds a quibble to escape the bargain.

In Norse mythology, Loki, having bet his head with Brokk and lost, forbids Brokk to take any part of his neck, saying he had not bet it; to avenge himself Brokk instead sews Loki's lips shut.

When the hero of the Child ballad The Lord of Lorn and the False Steward is forced to trade places with an impostor and swear never to reveal the truth to anyone, he tells his story to a horse while he knows that the heroine is eavesdropping. In the similar fairy tale The Goose Girl, the princess pours out her story to an iron stove, unaware that the king is listening.

When Croesus consulted the Pythia, he was told that going to war with Cyrus the Great would destroy a great empire. Croesus assumed that the seer meant that the Persian Empire would be destroyed and Croesus would triumph. He proceeded to attack the Persians, believing victory was assured. In the end, however, the Persians were victorious, and the empire destroyed was not Cyrus's but Croesus's.

In The Lord of the Rings, the Elf Glorfindel's prophecy states that "not by the hand of man will the Witch-king of Angmar fall." The Witch-king is slain by Éowyn, a woman, during the battle of the Pelennor Fields. She is aided by Merry, a male hobbit who distracted him by stabbing him with a Númenorean blade, as the Ringwraiths are harmed by such swords.

In Terry Pratchett's Moving Pictures, a book is said to inflict terrible fates on any man opening it, but causes only mild annoyance to the Librarian, who is in fact an orangutan.

References 

Narrative techniques